The halfpenny (d) coin was the second smallest denomination of the pre-decimal Irish pound, worth  of a pound or  of a shilling. First issued in 1928 it ceased to be legal tender on 1 August 1969.

The coin measured  in diameter and weighed 5.66990 grams. The bronze coin was made up of 95.5% copper, 3% tin and 1.5% zinc. This was identical to the British halfpenny as both countries' pounds were pegged until 1979.

The reverse design was by Percy Metcalfe, an English artist. The artist was given the choice of a boar, a sow or a ram, and the sow was chosen. The obverse featured the Irish harp. From 1928 to 1937 the date was split either side of the harp with the name Saorstát Éireann circling around. From 1938 to 1969 the inscription changed to Éire on the left of the harp and the date on the right.

See also

St Patrick halfpenny
£sd

References

External links
Coinage Act, 1926
Coinage (Dimensions and Designs) Order, 1928
Coinage (Calling In) Order, 1969
Irish Coinage website - catalogue - halfpenny

halfpenny coin